Robert Lee Hess (born December 19, 1991) is an American chess player who received the FIDE title of Grandmaster (GM) in 2009. In May 2012, his FIDE rating was 2635, fifth in the United States. Hess is a commentator for Chess.com, covering events such as the World Chess Championship and Candidates Tournament. He also streams chess content on his Twitch channel GMHess, which has 73,000+ followers.

Education 
Hess attended the Browning School, a private all-boys preparatory school in Manhattan. He is a graduate of Stuyvesant High School in New York. In the 2007–08 school year, he was a sophomore and the co-captain of Stuyvesant's junior varsity football team, on which he was a starting linebacker.

After deferring a year to play chess, Hess attended Yale University and graduated in 2015 with a degree in history. He became the co-founder and chief operating officer of The Sports Quotient, a now defunct sports blog.

Chess playing career
The 2006 U.S. Junior Champion, Hess achieved his final norm for the International Master title at the 2007 Cannes Open, and was later awarded the title IM by FIDE.

Hess achieved his first grandmaster norm at the 2008 Foxwoods Open, held on April 19 through April 23 at the Foxwoods Resort in Mashantucket, Connecticut. He scored 7–2, tying for first with grandmasters Alexander Shabalov, Yury Shulman, Julio Becerra, and Alexander Ivanov. Hess won his first two games against masters, then played seven grandmasters, scoring four wins, two draws, and one loss. His performance rating for the tournament was approximately 2770 USCF. Chess journalist Jerry Hanken called Hess's achievement "one of the greatest performances by an American teenager since the heyday of Bobby Fischer!"

Hess obtained his second norm by winning the SPICE Spring Grandmaster Invitational in March 2009. The next month, he secured his third and final grandmaster norm in the Foxwoods Open, a performance which included an upset over Hikaru Nakamura. In 2009 Hess also won the K-12 SuperNationals tournaments.

In the 2009 US Chess Championship in May, Hess tied for second with Alexander Onischuk, with a score of +5 −1 =3, losing only to eventual winner Nakamura. He was on the silver-medal US team at the 2009 World Team Championships in Bursa, Turkey. Hess was awarded the 2010 Samford Fellowship "based on his chess talent, work ethic, dedication and accomplishments". He was also a member of the 2010 US Olympiad Team. In December 2011 he tied for first–second with Alexander Kovchan in the Groningen Chess Festival, defeating Evgeny Romanov and Sergei Tiviakov on his way to a 2702 performance rating.

Hess won Group B in the 2011 U.S. Championship with a score of 5.5/7, defeating former champions Alexander Onischuk, Alexander Shabalov, and Larry Christiansen, all with the black pieces.

Hess scored additional successes in the late 2010s. In 2017, he won the North American Open in Las Vegas. In 2018, he scored 5.5/9 at the Isle of Man Masters, drawing with former world champion Viswanathan Anand in the process. Hess’s most recent major chess event is the FIDE Grand Swiss Tournament 2019, where he scored 5.5/11 and defeated then-reigning U.S. Champion Sam Shankland.

Notable games

Hess vs. Alexander Ivanov, 2008 Foxwoods Open 1.e4 g6 2.d4 Bg7 3.Nc3 c6 4.h4 d5 5.e5 f6 6.f4 h5 7.Bd3 Kf7 8.Qe2 Nh6 9.Be3 Bg4 10.Nf3 Nf5 11.Qf2 Nd7 12.Bd2 Bxf3 13.gxf3 Qb6 14.Na4 Qc7 15.Rg1 e6 16.0-0-0 Rag8 17.Rg2 Bf8 18.Rdg1 Be7 19.Nc3 Qd8 20.Ne4 dxe4 21.fxe4 Nh6 22.f5 Ng4 23.fxe6+ Kg7 24.Rxg4 hxg4 25.Rxg4 Nf8 26.exf6+ Bxf6 27.e5 Rh5 28.exf6+ Qxf6 29.Rf4 Qxe6 30.d5 Qxd5 31.Rf7+ 

Hikaru Nakamura vs. Hess, 2009 Foxwoods Open 1.c4 Nf6 2.Nc3 e6 3.e4 c5 4.e5 Ng8 5.Nf3 Nc6 6.d4 cxd4 7.Nxd4 Nxe5 8.Ndb5 f6 9.Bf4 a6 10.Nd6+ Bxd6 11.Qxd6 Nf7 12.Qa3 Ne7 13.Nb5 e5 14.Bd2 d6 15.Bb4 Nf5 16.O-O-O Be6 17.Nxd6+ N7xd6 18.Bxd6 Nxd6 19.Rxd6 Qe7 20.Be2 Rc8 21.b3 Kf7 22.Kb2 Rhd8 23.Rhd1 Rxd6 24.Rxd6 Rd8 25.c5 a5 26.Bh5+ g6 27.Bf3 Qc7 28.Rxd8 Qxd8 29.Kc1 Bf5 30.b4 Qd4 31.bxa5 Qxf2 32.Qb3+ Kg7 33.Qxb7+ Kh6 34.Qb2 Qxc5+ 35.Kd1 e4 36.Be2 e3 37.Ke1 Qxa5+ 38.Kf1 Qc7 39.Qd4 Qc1+ 40.Qd1 Qb2 41.a4 Qb4 42.Kg1 Bd7 43.Qa1 Qf4 44.Qf1 Qxf1+ 45.Kxf1 Bxa4 46.Bd3 Bd1 47.Be2 Bc2 48.Bb5 f5 49.g3 g5 

Sam Shankland vs. Hess, 2019 Isle of Man 1.d4 Nf6 2.c4 e6 3.g3 d5 4.Bg2 dxc4 5.Nf3 c5 6.O-O Nc6 7.Qa4 Bd7 8.Qxc4 b5 9.Qc3 Rc8 10.dxc5 Nd5 11.Qc2 Ncb4 12.Qd1 Bxc5 13.e4 Nf6 14.Nc3 Ng4 15.Qe2 Qb6 16.a3 Bxf2+ 17.Kh1 Nc6 18.e5 Bc5 19.b4 Be7 20.h3 Nd4 21.Nxd4 Qxd4 22.Bb2 Ne3 23.Rf4 Qb6 24.Be4 Nc4 25.Raf1 Nxb2 26.Rxf7 Rxc3 27.Qg4 Qe3 28.Rxe7+ Kxe7 29.Qxg7+ Kd8 30.Qxh8+ Kc7 31.Bg2 Nd3 32.Qf8 Nxe5 33.Rd1 Nd3 34.Kh2 Rc2

Other chess work

Coaching 
Hess was the coach of the U.S. team at the 44th Chess Olympiad and also coached the U.S. women’s team at the 42nd and 43rd Chess Olympiads in 2016 and 2018. He was a second to Fabiano Caruana at the Chess World Cup 2021 in Sochi, Russia.

Additionally, Hess has coached PogChamps participants Ludwig Ahgren and Hafu. Hess and Ahgren together won the Twitch Rivals Hand & Brain Showdown in 2021.

Commentary 
Hess is a longtime commentator for Chess.com and was on the call for the 2021 World Chess Championship along with Daniel Rensch and Fabiano Caruana. Hess has also commentated for the Chess.com Speed Chess Championship and Junior Speed Chess Championship, the Pro Chess League, the Chess.com Global Championship, and PogChamps, as well as done Chess.com commentary for major events such as Tata Steel.

Hess has appeared as a panelist at the MIT Sloan Sports Analytics Conference occasions since 2019, discussing topics such as chess engines and lessons that chess can offer to other sports.

Charity 
Hess is a longtime supporter of the Charity Chess Championship, which in 2017 raised over $20,000 for Band of Parents; in 2018 raised over $56,000 for ovarian cancer research at Mount Sinai Hospital, and in 2019 raised over $60,000 for pancreatic cancer research at Memorial Sloan Kettering Center.

References

External links 
 
 
 
 
 
 
 

1991 births
Living people
American chess players
Chess grandmasters
Stuyvesant High School alumni
Browning School alumni
Yale University alumni
Twitch (service) streamers